The 2004 Toyota Atlantic Championship season was contested over 12 rounds. 11 different teams and 24 different drivers competed. In this one-make formula all drivers had to utilize Swift chassis and Toyota engines. This season also saw a C2-class running older Swift chassis and Toyota engines. In C2-class five different drivers competed, but none of them for the whole season. The Toyota Atlantic Championship Presented by Yokohama Drivers' Champion was Jon Fogarty driving for Pacific Coast Motorsports.

Calendar

bold indicate pole position

Final points standings

Driver

Main championship

For every race the points were awarded: 31 points to the winner, 27 for runner-up, 25 for third place, 23 for fourth place, 21 for fifth place, 19 for sixth place, 17 for seventh place, 15 for eighth place, 13 for ninth place, 11 for tenth place, winding down to 1 point for 20th place. Lower placed drivers did not award points. Additional points were awarded to the fastest qualifier on Friday (1 point), the fastest qualifier on Saturday (1 point), any driver leading at least one lap in the race (1 point), the most improved driver from start to finish (1 point) and the driver setting the fastest lap (1 point). So the maximum for one driver in one race is to earn 35 points. Oval races only saw one qualifying. C2-class drivers were not able to score points in the main class.

Note:

Race 1 Alfred Unser and David Sterckx only awarded with half points, because they ran non-parity engines. Alfred Unser 3/2=1.5 rounded up 2 points. David Sterckx 11+1=12/2=6 points.

Race 3 only one additional point for the qualifying - oval race.

Race 4 and 5 only one additional point awarded to the fastest qualifier, because only one session was held for each race.

Race 11 no additional point awarded to the most improved driver, because the most improved driver was C2-class driver Cam Binder.

In all races not all points were awarded (not enough competitors).

C2-Class championship

Points system see above. But additional points only awarded for the fastest qualifier.

Note:

No more competitors in C2-class. Four races without a single entry.

Complete Overview

R19=retired, but classified NS=did not start (8)=place after practice, but grid position not held free

See also
 2004 Champ Car season
 2004 Indianapolis 500
 2004 IndyCar Series season
 2004 Infiniti Pro Series season

External links
ChampCarStats.com

Atlantic
Atlantic
Atlantic Championship Season, 2004
Atlantic Championship seasons
Atlantic